The New York State Department of Labor (DOL or NYSDOL) is the department of the New York state government that enforces labor law and administers unemployment benefits.

The mission of the New York State Department of Labor is to protect workers, assist the unemployed and connect job seekers to jobs, according to its website. It works to ensure a fair wage for all workers, protect the safety and health of workers and the public, help the unemployed via temporary payments (unemployment insurance), link job seekers with employers, and guide workers to training. Its regulations are compiled in title 12 of the New York Codes, Rules and Regulations.

The NYS Department of Labor of today came as a direct result of the Triangle Shirtwaist Factory Fire, which took place on March 25, 1911.

Adequacy of wages
The commissioner can investigate whether minimum wages are sufficient for adequate maintenance and health. The commissioner shall investigate upon the petition of fifty or more residents in one or more occupations. If minimum wages are insufficient in the commissioner's opinion, they shall appoint a wage board. Wage boards are divided equally amongst employer, employee, and general public representatives and are empowered to issue subpoenas for hearings and investigations.

Indicators commonly used at international level to guide assessment of statutory minimum wage adequacy include comparing the gross minimum wage to 60% of the gross median wage and 50% of the gross average wage. Unemployment Insurance (UI) tax reports provide the samples for federal OEWS and QCEW data, but gig workers (e.g. in the platform economy) are typically classified as independent contractors and therefore not included in those or other federal data. The Research and Statistics Division maintains the monthly statewide "cost of labor index" and annual multi-county "labor market composite wage rate". Every employer must maintain six years of payroll records for covered employees containing contemporaneous data for each week worked: hours worked, rates of pay, gross wages, deductions, allowances claimed as part of the minimum wage, and net wages.

Collective bargaining

The New York State Employment Relations Act (SERA), enacted in 1937 and codified at Article 20 of the Labor Law, was designed to cover employees who don't qualify for protection under the National Labor Relations Act of 1935 or the Railway Labor Act, particularly for small workplaces. The state Taylor Law defines the rights and limitations of unions for public employees. The Public Employment Relations Board (PERB) is responsible for administering the adjudicatory and conciliation provisions of SERA and the Taylor Law.

Unemployment insurance

The New York Unemployment Insurance Law, enacted in 1935 and codified at Article 18 of the Labor Law, implements US unemployment insurance within New York. As with most states, the maximum period for receiving benefits is 26 full weeks during a one-year period (benefit year). Generally, eligibility follows federal guidelines, where examples of quitting for good cause include domestic violence, immediate family with illness or disability, spousal employment location changes, where the DOL  determines that pay and/or hours of work were reduced substantially, or where the DOL determines the employer did not address a safety hazard. Normally, a labor strike must last for 14 days before claimants are eligible, unless due to a lockout (suspension period). The process for claiming weekly benefits (certifying for benefits), for each week of unemployment while looking for work, begins on last day of that week (Sunday) through the following Saturday (claim window, waiting period, or waiting week). The Unemployment Insurance Appeal Board (UIAB) hears appeals against Labor Department determinations on issues of eligibility and contribution liability.

Workforce development

The department implements the federal Workforce Innovation and Opportunity Act (WIOA or WIA). It operates a network of career centers (one-stop centers) throughout the state that offer a range of employment and training services, including job search assistance, resume writing help, and access to job training programs. Programs include the Adult Program, the Dislocated Worker Program, and the Youth Program, as well as apprenticeship programs in a variety of industries including construction, healthcare, and manufacturing. For businesses it supports job posting services, on-the-job training programs, and customized training programs.

History

1900s–1910s

Inception/Beginnings (1901) 
On February 7, the Bureau of Labor Statistics, the Department of Factory Inspection and the Board of Mediation and Arbitration consolidated to form the New York State Department of Labor, headed by an Industrial Commissioner of Labor.

1910s 
In 1913, reorganization of the Department of Labor led to the creation of the Industrial Board, an advisory board tasked with increasing awareness of and enforcing the NYS Industrial Code, a set of rules and regulations with the force of law that affects the health, safety and comfort of workers. This Board made the Department of Labor an administrative as well as a regulatory agency. The Division for Industrial Hygiene, for technical research, was also established at this time.

On July 11, 1913, thirty-three women and two men lost their lives in the Binghamton Clothing Company Fire. The Triangle and Binghamton tragedies gave impetus to labor legislation, and the State Constitution was amended on November 4 to permit a Workmen’s Compensation Law.

The NYS Legislature consolidated the Workmen’s Compensation Commission with the NYS Department of Labor in 1915. A five-member Industrial Commission, headed by an Industrial Commissioner, was appointed to run the Department, replacing the Commissioner of Labor, the Industrial Board, and the Workmen’s Compensation Commission.

The Industrial Commission created the Bureau of Women in Industry, the precursor to the modern Division of Labor Standards, in 1918.

1920s to 1950s

1920s 
In 1921, the NYS Legislature reorganized the Department of Labor, placing quasi-judicial and legislative powers in an Industrial Board and assigning administrative matters to a single Industrial Commissioner.

An amendment to the State Constitution in 1926 reorganized the more than 180 scattered departments, bureaus, boards and commissioners of State government into 18 departments, one of which was the Department of Labor.

In 1929, Frances Perkins is appointed by the newly elected New York governor Franklin D. Roosevelt as the inaugural industrial commissioner.

1930s 
In 1933, the Prevailing Rates of Wage amendment to the NYS Labor Law charged the Industrial Commissioner with determining wages to be paid on all public works of the State (except those done for a city).

After the Social Security Act of 1935 authorized unemployment insurance for the jobless, NYS DOL created the Division of Unemployment Insurance, which soon merged with the State Employment Service.

The New York Unemployment Insurance Law was enacted in April 1935 and codified at Article 18 of the Labor Law and made employers of 4 people over 13 weeks (or more) liable for taxes, excluding government, agriculture, religious, scientific, literary, or educational organizations. The New York Court of Appeals and US Supreme Court (by an evenly split court) upheld the law in 1936 in Chamberlin, Inc. v. Andrews (271 N.Y. 1, affirmed per curiam 299 U.S. 515, rehearing denied 301 U.S. 714).

The New York State Employment Relations Act, also known as NYSERA, SERA, or the Little Wagner Act, and codified at Article 20 of the Labor Law, was enacted in 1937 and modeled after the National Labor Relations Act of 1935.

In 1937, the rule-making and variance-granting power of the DOL's Industrial Board was transferred to the Board of Standards and Appeals. The Industrial Board retained jurisdiction only in workmen’s compensation cases. The Labor Relations Board was established at this time to supervise labor-management relations, and the State Board of Mediation was set up to mediate settlements in labor disputes, carrying on services that had been provided since 1886. Also in 1937, New York passed a minimum wage law protecting women and minors.

The Fair Labor Standards Act of 1938 set a national minimum wage standard and a forty hour work week, and in this same year, an amendment to the New York State Constitution established a "Bill of Rights" for working people. The Unemployment Insurance Appeal Board (UIAB) was also established in 1938, to hear appeals from claimants or employers dissatisfied with departmental administrative determinations.

1940s 
In January 1942, for the duration of World War II, the President of the United States absorbed the New York State Employment Service into the National Manpower Program.

In 1944, New York State’s Minimum Wage Law was amended to include men.

In 1945, the NYS Industrial Board was replaced by the Workmen’s Compensation Board.

The National Manpower Program ended in 1946, and control of the Employment Service was returned to New York State. Also in this year, New York first passed laws regulating the hours which minors could work during non-school hours.

1960s to 1990s

1960s 
The Taylor Law (Public Employees Fair Employment Act) of 1967 defines the rights and limitations of unions for public employees.

1970s 
In 1971, both Unemployment Services and Manpower Services, formerly the part of the Division of Employment, became part of the Department of Labor.

The federal government passed the Comprehensive Employment and Training Act (CETA), under which allocation of funds is locally oriented, in 1973, and in 1974, NYSDOL began implementing the act in New York State.

In 1975, Occupational Safety and Health Administration (OSHA) takes over enforcement of federal safety and health regulation in the private sector. The State Labor Department retains responsibility where no federal standards apply and enforces safety and health regulations in the public sector. Under contract with OSHA, DOL offers the On-site Consultation Program.

In 1978, the Workmen's Compensation Board was renamed the Workers' Compensation Board, and the Board of Standards and Appeals was renamed the Industrial Board of Appeals.

1980s 
The Job Training Partnership Act (JTPA) of 1982 replaced the CETA. The new law provided localities with federal funds for employment training.

In 1987, DOL began its regulation of asbestos control activities in the state.

1990s 
In 1991, New York State became the first state in the U.S. to require both school and parental permission for teenagers to work past 10 p.m. In 1992, it also became the first state in the U.S. to establish enforceable guidelines to protect public employees against tuberculosis in the workplace.

The NYS Department of Labor debuted the first iteration of its website in 1995.

In an effort to reform Workers' Compensation, the NYS Legislature passed Governor George Pataki’s New York Employment, Safety and Security Act of 1996, which significantly reduced workers' compensation costs for employers. Also at this time, “hot goods’ legislation prohibited sale or distribution of apparel produced in sweatshops.

In 1997, welfare reform legislation authorized DOL to administer New York Works, NYS's  $400-million welfare-to-work program, leading to the formation of the Welfare-To-Work Division, and DOL began testing Claims by Phone, which was the beginning of the current Unemployment Insurance Telephone Claims Centers.

2000s to present

2000s 
New York State minimum wage was raised to $5.15 per hour and linked to federal minimum wage in 2000.

In 2001, DOL completed the conversion of the Unemployment Insurance program from in-person filing to a new filing system using an Interactive Voice Response systems and a touch-tone phone. Additionally, UI applications went online through the department’s website.

In the wake of the September 11th terrorist attack, DOL mobilized to work with state, federal and NYC agencies to aid in the relief and recovery efforts. With $25 million in National Emergency Grant Funding, NYSDOL was able to provide essential services to victims and dislocated workers.

In 2005, the Department of Labor’s Apparel Industry Task Force was expanded into the Fair Wages Task Force, and its enforcement was expanded to include restaurants, laundries, grocery stores and gardening services. The Fair Wages Task Force was also created at this time, to investigate industries where wages were low and workers were likely to be exploited. In its first year of existence, the Fair Wage Task force completed more than 400 investigations and found more than $5.3 million due to nearly 5,100 underpaid workers.

In 2007, the final increment of the NYS Minimum Wage increase from $5.15 to $7.25, and Workers’ Compensation Reform took effect. NYS UI claimants were issued Direct Payment Cards for Unemployment Insurance benefits, and recipients also were given the option of receiving benefit payments via Direct Deposit, rather than via a Direct Payment Card. Also in 2007, the Bureau of Immigrant Workers’ Rights (now the Division of Immigrant Policies and Affairs) was created to address the growing needs of immigrant workers throughout the state.

In 2009, M. Patricia Smith, who later became the Solicitor of the United States Department of Labor, was the labor commissioner.

2010s to present 

2010 saw the passage of both the NYS Construction Industry Fair Play Act, which made it illegal for an employer to misclassify employees as independent contractors or pay employees off the books, and the Domestic Workers Bill of Rights, the first law of its kind in the nation.

Effective 22 July 2010, the Public Employment Relations Board (PERB) became responsible for administering the adjudicatory and conciliation provisions of the New York State Employment Relations Act.

In 2013, Governor Cuomo announced sweeping reforms to New York State's Workers Compensation and Unemployment Insurance programs, which were designed to save employers $1.2 billion.

The NYS Commercial Goods Transportation Industry Fair Play Act went into effect in April 2014. This law created a new standard for determining whether a driver of commercial vehicles who transports goods is an employee or independent contractor.

According to an audit released in June 2014 by State Comptroller Thomas DiNapoli, the Department of Labor did not complete many of its wage theft investigations in a timely manner. As of late August 2013, the DOL had more than 17,000 open cases, consisting of about 9,300 active investigations and more than 7,800 cases pending payment, and of these almost 13,000, or 75%, were at least one year old from initial claim date. In 2013, the DOL had 142 employees statewide, including 85–90 investigators, handling the complaints. By 2015, the caseload had been handled and 85% of investigations were being completed within 6 months. In 2015 alone, the agency had distributed a record $31.5 million to victims of wage theft.

In May 2015, acting labor commissioner Mario Musolino appointed a state wage board to investigate wages for fast food workers. In July, the board issued a report recommending a $15-an-hour minimum wage for fast food workers, and in September 2015 acting commissioner Musolino issued an order accepting the recommendations. Effective December 31, 2015, the department adopted amended codified regulations (12 NYCRR part 146) implementing the report and order.

In 2015, Roberta Reardon, a former AFL–CIO and SAG-AFTRA official, was nominated as the state labor commissioner, and was confirmed by the Senate on June 15, 2016.

In 2016, as part of the 2016–17 State Budget, Governor Cuomo signed legislation enacting a incremental statewide $15 minimum wage plan. On December 31, 2016, the first in a series of wage increases went into effect.

In 2020, tip allowances for employees under the Miscellaneous Wage Order were reduced by 50% by end of June, and eliminated entirely by December 31 (for all industries except hospitality, farmworkers and building service).

Commissioners

Further reading

References

External links 
 New York State Department of Labor
 Unemployment Insurance Appeal Board (UIAB)
 Public Employment Relations Board (PERB)
 Department of Labor in the New York Codes, Rules and Regulations (NYCRR)
 Department of Labor in Open NY (https://data.ny.gov/)
 New York State's Minimum Wage
 New York Department of Labor recipient profile on USAspending.gov
 Department of Labor contracts on Open Book New York from the New York State Department of Audit and Control

Labor
State departments of labor of the United States
Labor relations in New York (state)